Keith Cromwell (born September 7, 1979) is an American professional lacrosse player. He was a member of the Minnesota Swarm in the National Lacrosse League and of the Long Island Lizards of Major League Lacrosse. He played the attack position. He graduated from Rutgers University in 2001. Cromwell was also hired in 2007 by Manhasset High School as the Boys Varsity Lacrosse Offensive Coordinator.

Keith Cromwell played at Rutgers from 1998 to 2001, posting one of the most accomplished careers in Rutgers lacrosse history. Cromwell is the leading scorer in school history, totaling 152 goals and 266 points. He also recorded 114 assists, which is third in program history. He totaled at least 65 points in three seasons, while scoring 42 and 44 goals in his sophomore and junior campaigns. All of those marks rank among the top-10 single season performances in Rutgers history.

The Hicksville, N.Y., native was a three-time USILA Lacrosse All-American, capping his career with First Team All-American honors in 2001 after Second Team and Honorable Mention selections the previous two seasons. He was a two-time team captain and four-time winner of the team's William Miller Trophy, given to the player who made the greatest contribution to the team during the season. Cromwell also earned the Coursen Award (Outstanding Male Athlete) from the Rutgers athletic department in 2001.

After his collegiate career, Cromwell was the seventh overall selection in the inaugural Major League Lacrosse Draft. He was named MLL Rookie of the Year in 2001 and went on to play 12 seasons in the league, ranking in the top five all-time in assists. He also has spent years as a lacrosse coach, including spending the 2011-12 season as an assistant at Rutgers. In 2013, he was inducted into the Long Island Lacrosse Hall of Fame.

Professional career
Cromwell was drafted by Bridgeport Barrage in 2001. He won the MLL rookie of the year that season. He was a member of the MLL championship team Philadelphia Barrage in 2004. He did not play in 2005. Before the 2006 MLL season, his rights were traded to Long Island Lizards where he is currently playing.

Statistics

NLL

MLL

Awards

References

1979 births
Living people
American lacrosse players
Major League Lacrosse major award winners
Major League Lacrosse players
Minnesota Swarm players
Philadelphia Wings players
Rutgers Scarlet Knights men's lacrosse players